Griffytown is a neighborhood of Louisville, Kentucky located in unincorporated Jefferson County, along Old Harrods Creek Road. Streets within its boundaries include: Bellewood Road, Robert Road, Church Lane, Lincoln Way, Cox Lane, Malcolm Avenue, Plainview Avenue and Booker Road. In 1879, a freed slave named Dan Griffith, an African American, purchased a cabin from Mr. Minor White, an early Middletown settler, and moved it to the land he had been living on along Old Harrods Creek Road, and the neighborhood appears to be named for him. From its beginnings through the mid 70s, Griffytown had a very rural character with primarily small, shotgun-style homes, dirt roads, backyard gardens and small farms. The majority of these houses had no indoor plumbing. During those early years, up until the end of World War II, many of its residents were maids, cooks, butlers, chauffeurs, and gardeners for the wealthy white families of nearby Anchorage and Middletown. The neighborhood was redeveloped in the 1970s through urban renewal and many dilapidated houses were demolished, remaining homes had indoor plumbing and bathrooms installed, and new homes were built on the vacant lots. It remains a predominantly African American community, although a number of families of other races live there as well. The Louisville and Jefferson County African American Heritage Committee placed a historical marker near 401 Old Harrods Creek Road, designating the southwest boundary.

See also
Berrytown, Louisville

References

Further reading

Neighborhoods in Louisville, Kentucky
Populated places in Kentucky established by African Americans